Events from the year 2002 in Sweden

Incumbents
 Monarch – Carl XVI Gustaf
 Prime Minister – Göran Persson

Events

January
 1 January - Jan O. Karlsson replaces Maj-Inger Klingvall as Minister for International Development Cooperation and Minister for Migration.
 1 January - Svensk Kassaservice is split from The Post and local post offices are closed down.
 15 January - Ingegerd Wärnersson resigns as Minister for Schools.
 16 January - Thomas Östros replaces Ingegerd Wärnersson as Minister for Schools.
 18 January - Skanska is convicted of environmental crimes that occurred during the construction of Hallandsås Tunnel and is fined €300,000.
 21 January - The murder of Fadime Sahindal takes place.
 31 January - NCC admits that they have participated in Asphalt cartels.

February
 20 February - The Palindrome Date occurs in Sweden at 20:02, 20:02 20-02-2002.
 26 February - The Rinkeby murder takes place.

March
 3 March - Daniel Tynell from the Falun-Borlänge SK cross-country skiing club wins Vasaloppet.
 6 March - Demoex is founded.

April
 11 April - An earthquake occurs in Kusmark, Skellefteå, it is measured to 3.3 on the Richter magnitude scale.
 18 April - The last episode of Rederiet is aired on SVT which ends a 10 year serial of 318 episodes.

May
 12 May - Peter Eriksson and Maria Wetterstrand are elected leaders of the Green Party.

June

July
 31 July - Tony Deogan, a supporter of IFK Göteborg, is severely injured in a hooligan fight with supporters of AIK in the Högalid Park in Stockholm.

August
 14 August - The Cross Light Rail in Stockholm is extented from Gullmarsplan to Sicka Udde.
 23 August - Västermalmsgallerian is inaugurated.

September
 11 September - Marie Fredriksson collapses in her bathroom and after being rushed to Karolinska University Hospital is diagnosed with cancer after finding a brain tumor in her head.
 15 September - The 2002 Swedish general election is held.
 17 September - Fulufjället National Park is established.

October

November
 18 November - Telia merges with Sonera and forms TeliaSonera.

December
 21 December - A baby girl is found dead in an underpass Brunna, Kungsängen northwest of Stockholm.
 28 December - Marcus Noren is murdered in an apartment in Halmstad by a 28 or 46-year-old suspect. His body is later dumped in Nissan.

Deaths

 11 January – Hilding Mickelsson, photographer (born 1919)
 17 January – Eddie Meduza, composer and musician (born 1948)
 21 January – Fadime Şahindal, student and politician (born 1975)
 28 January – Astrid Lindgren, children's writer (born 1907).
 4 February – Sigvard Bernadotte, industrial designer (born 1907)
 19 February – Arne Selmosson, football player (born 1931)
 10 March – Erik Lönnroth, historian (born 1910)
 18 March – Gösta Winbergh, opera singer (born 1943)
 29 April – Sune Andersson, footballer (born 1921).
 7 June – Signe Hasso, actress, writer, composer (born 1915)
 4 July – Sten Samuelson, architect (born 1926)
 19 August – Jan Stenbeck, business leader, media pioneer, sailor and financier (born 1942)
 6 November – Folke Frölén, horse rider (born 1908).
 10 November – Anne-Marie Brunius, actress (born 1916)
 8 December – Gunnar Helén, politician (born 1918)
 21 December – Kjell Larsson, politician (born 1943)
 26 December – Åke Lindström, actor (born 1928)

See also
 2002 in Swedish television

References

 
Years of the 21st century in Sweden
2000s in Sweden
Sweden
Sweden